"Christmas Makes Me Cry" is the third single from Christian singer, Mandisa. The single comes from her 2007 Christmas EP, Christmas Joy, and was released on November 6, 2007. It features Christian singer and producer, Matthew West. The song was re-released a year later as the first single from Mandisa's full-length Christmas album It's Christmas.

Release history

Charts

2007 singles
Mandisa songs
American Christmas songs
Sparrow Records singles
2007 songs
Songs written by Matthew West
Songs written by Sam Mizell